The Women's Antifascist Front of Macedonia (abbreviated АФЖ, AFŽ) was a World War II-era feminist movement in Macedonia and the predecessor to several present-day feminist organisations in North Macedonia. It was formed by volunteers along with other Women's Antifascist Fronts in Yugoslavia and was one of only four to also become an organised resistance movement. The predecessor of the organization are the commissions for work with women of the Macedonian Communist Party. In the spring of 1943, the first such committees were formed in Kavadarci and Negotino, and the organization was officially founded on December 14, 1944 in Skopje.

The most prominent figure in the movement was Veselinka Malinska, a decorated World War II in Yugoslav Macedonia veteran and ASNOM participant. The movement was closely affiliated with the Greek Civil War organisation, the National Liberation Front which had a substantial number of female partisans.

The AFŽ's main goal was to improve schooling for females and increase their literacy rate, as a majority of illiterates at the time were women. The organisation, much like their allies, the National Liberation Front and the National Liberation Youth Association in Greek Macedonia, were labelled "bandits" by the Greek government following World War II.

See also
Women's Antifascist Front of Bosnia and Herzegovina
Women's Antifascist Front of Croatia

References

External links
 President Branko Crvenkovski is patron of the manifestation marking the 60th anniversary of the Women’s Antifascist Front of Macedonia 

Anti-fascist organizations
Yugoslav Macedonia in World War II
Feminist organizations in North Macedonia
Organizations established in 1942

Women's wings of political parties
1942 establishments in Yugoslavia